Valery Kotov (born 8 March 1939) is a Soviet speed skater. He competed in the men's 5000 metres event at the 1960 Winter Olympics.

References

1939 births
Living people
Soviet male speed skaters
Olympic speed skaters of the Soviet Union
Speed skaters at the 1960 Winter Olympics
Place of birth missing (living people)